Soldsie is a social eCommerce platform based in San Francisco, CA. Co-founders Chris Bennett (CEO) and Arrel Gray (CTO) met through the startup community of Silicon Valley in 2011. They officially launched Soldsie in May 2012 at a time when the viability of 
f-Commerce was still being questioned by the industry. The founders of Soldsie were able to show that Facebook commerce is a viable form of social commerce when it wasn’t just another tab on a retailer's Facebook page for users to click onto.

Their social shopping platform allows businesses to monetize their social media pages through the use of comments, allowing brands to directly sell on Facebook and Instagram. Retailers looking at selling on Facebook or Instagram upload products according to a template that includes price and item description. They can then schedule campaigns, or sales of multiple items, that post at the designated time. Fans register through email and comment 'Sold' to trigger the purchasing process. The process is managed through a backend dashboard that compiles all the comments and then allows retailers to send invoices to buyers. Retailers can also turn on automatic invoices, track customers, and put buyers on a waitlist for out-of-stock items. This process allows businesses to turn their Facebook and Instagram pages into points of sale.

Soldsie raised $1 million for its full seed round. In addition to raising $425,000 from 72 investors through FundersClub, Soldsie also received funding from 500 Startups and e.ventures to close out its seed round. On May 15, 2014 it was announced that Soldsie had raised 4 million for their Series A funding.

As of May 2014, Soldsie has processed over $25 million in transactions, representing an increase of threefold over 2013.

References

External links 
 Official Website

Electronic trading platforms
Online retailers of the United States